Jackie Brown: Music from the Miramax Motion Picture is the soundtrack to Quentin Tarantino's motion picture Jackie Brown.  It was originally released on December 9, 1997. The soundtrack uses a variety of music genres, including soul.  The soundtrack also includes dialogue from the motion picture and a lack of typical film score, similar to the other soundtracks of Tarantino films.

Track listing

"Across 110th Street" by Bobby Womack and Peace – 3:48
"Beaumont's Lament" (Dialogue excerpt featuring Samuel L. Jackson & Robert De Niro) – 0:50
"Strawberry Letter 23" by The Brothers Johnson – 4:58
"Melanie, Simone and Sheronda" (Dialogue excerpt featuring Samuel L. Jackson & Robert De Niro) – 0:32
"Who Is He (And What Is He to You)?" by Bill Withers – 3:12
"Tennessee Stud" by Johnny Cash – 2:54
"Natural High" by Bloodstone – 4:54
"Long Time Woman" by Pam Grier – 2:52
"Detroit 9000" (Dialogue excerpt featuring Council Cargle) – 0:07
"(Holy Matrimony) Letter to the Firm" by Foxy Brown – 3:26
"Street Life" performed by Randy Crawford – 4:18
"Didn't I (Blow Your Mind This Time)" by The Delfonics – 3:21
"Midnight Confessions" by The Grass Roots – 2:43
"Inside My Love" by Minnie Riperton – 3:56
"Just Ask Melanie" (Dialogue excerpt featuring Samuel L. Jackson, Robert De Niro & Bridget Fonda) – 0:43
"The Lions and the Cucumber" by The Vampire Sound Incorporation – 5:07
"Monte Carlo Nights" by Elliot Easton's Tiki Gods – 3:25

Tarantino's selection process for the songs
Tarantino has said that in developing the script for Jackie Brown, he decided on the majority of the songs during the writing stage. He added:

Other tracks heard in the film
Some of the songs used in the film were not included in the commercially released soundtrack. These songs are listed during the film's credits.
 "Baby Love" by The Supremes
 "Exotic Dance" by Roy Ayers
 "My Touch of Madness" by Jermaine Jackson
 "La La La Means I Love You" by the Delfonics
 "Cissy Strut" by The Meters
 "Aragon" by Roy Ayers
 "Brawling Broads" by Roy Ayers
 "She Puts Me in the Mood" by Elvin Bishop
 "Undun" by the Guess Who
 "Escape" by Roy Ayers
 "Vittrone's Theme - King is Dead" by Roy Ayers
 "Grazing in the Grass" by Orchestra Harlow
 "Mad Dog (Feroce)" by Umberto Smaila
 "Jizz Da Pitt" by Slash's Snakepit

Personnel
 Quentin Tarantino and Lawrence Bender – Executive album producers 
 Mary Ramos and Michele Huznetsky – Music consultants
 Tom Baker – Mastering
 Ann Karlin and John Katovsich – Music coordinators

Certifications

Notes

Maverick Records soundtracks
1997 soundtrack albums